In Greek mythology, Aristolochus (Ancient Greek: Ἀριστόλοχον means "well-born") was an Achaean soldier who was slew by the hero Aeneas. The latter crushed Aristolochus' head with a great stone which broke both his helmet and skull together.

Note

References 

 Quintus Smyrnaeus, The Fall of Troy translated by Way. A. S. Loeb Classical Library Volume 19. London: William Heinemann, 1913. Online version at theio.com
 Quintus Smyrnaeus, The Fall of Troy. Arthur S. Way. London: William Heinemann; New York: G.P. Putnam's Sons. 1913. Greek text available at the Perseus Digital Library.

Achaeans (Homer)